Acacia rhigiophylla, commonly known as dagger-leaf wattle, is a shrub belonging to the genus Acacia and the subgenus Juliflorae that is native to southern Australia.

Description
The bark is brown in colour and quite roughened and flaky near the base of stems. Like most species of Acacia it has phyllodes rather than true leaves. The rigid phyllodes are a dark green colour and noticeably pungent and have a total of three to six prominent veins. It blooms between September and October producing bright yellow flowers. The seed pods that form after flowering have a linear shape but are a little constricted between each of the seeds.

Acacia colletioides) has a very similar habit to A. rhigiophylla but has a much wider range. Acacia oxycedrus has similar phyllodes but has much longer inflorescences.

Taxonomy
The species was first formally described by George Bentham and Ferdinand von Mueller in 1855 as part of the work Plantae Muellerianae: Mimoseae as published by in Linnaea: ein Journal für die Botanik in ihrem ganzen Umfange, oder Beiträge zur Pflanzenkunde. It was reclassified as Racosperma rhigiophyllum by Leslie Pedley in 2003 then transferred back to genus Acacia in 2006.

Distribution
It has a disjunct distribution parts of South Australia and New South Wales . In South Australia it is found in a limited area on the Eyre Peninsula and in the Murray region where it is usually a part of open scrub-land communities and is often associated with Eucalyptus socialis and Eucalyptus gracilis and is found growing in grey-brown calcareous loamy and hard alkaline red duplex soils.

See also
List of Acacia species

References

rhigiophylla
Flora of South Australia
Flora of New South Wales
Taxa named by Ferdinand von Mueller
Plants described in 1855